Solar Bears may refer to:
Solar Bears (musical duo), an Irish electronic music duo
Orlando Solar Bears (IHL), an ice hockey team in the IHL
Orlando Solar Bears (ECHL), an ice hockey team in the ECHL